Paani Puri is an Indian television series that show that was aired on STAR One from 30 August 2008 to 25 September 2009.

Plot
It focuses on two completely different families from completely different backgrounds, living together under one roof. Apart from the clash of culture and class, the show includes fights between mothers-in-law (saases) and daughters-in-law (bahus).

Cast
Sumeet Raghavan as Vikas Puri
Smita Bansal as Divya Paani
Shagufta Ali
Bhavana Balsavar
Sudhir Pandey

References

External links
 

2008 Indian television series debuts
2009 Indian television series endings
Indian comedy television series
Star One (Indian TV channel) original programming